Quintus Caecilius Metellus Pius Scipio (c. 95 – 46 BC), often referred to as Metellus Scipio, was a Roman senator and military commander. During the civil war between Julius Caesar and the senatorial faction led by Pompey, he was a staunch supporter of the latter. He led troops against Caesar's forces, mainly in the battles of Pharsalus and Thapsus, where he was defeated. He later committed suicide. Ronald Syme called him "the last Scipio of any consequence in Roman history."

Family connections and name
The son of Publius Cornelius Scipio Nasica, praetor about 95 BC, and Licinia, Scipio was the grandson of Publius Cornelius Scipio Nasica, consul in 111, and Lucius Licinius Crassus, consul in 95. His great-grandfather was Scipio Nasica Serapio, the man who murdered Tiberius Gracchus in 133 BC. Through his mother Cornelia, Serapio was also the grandson of Scipio Africanus. Scipio's father died not long after his praetorship, and was survived by two sons and two daughters. The brother was adopted by their grandfather Crassus, but left little mark on history.

Publius Scipio, as he was referred to in contemporary sources early in his life, was adopted in adulthood through the testament of Quintus Caecilius Metellus Pius, consul in 80 BC and pontifex maximus. He retained his patrician status: "Scipio's ancestry," notes Syme, "was unmatched for splendour." As Jerzy Linderski has shown at length, this legal process constitutes adoption only in a loose sense; Scipio becomes a Caecilius Metellus in name while inheriting the estate of Metellus Pius, but was never his "son" while the pontifex maximus was alive. He was sometimes called "Metellus Scipio", or just "Scipio", after his adoption. The official form of his name as evidenced in a decree of the senate was "Q. Caecilius Q. f. Fab. Metellus Scipio."

Scipio married Aemilia Lepida, daughter of Mamercus Aemilius Lepidus Livianus, consul in 77 BC, but was not without rival in seeking to marry Aemilia Lepida. The virginal Cato had also wanted to marry Aemilia but lost out:

The couple had one son, a Metellus Scipio who seems to have died when he was only 18. Another son may have been born around 70 BC, or a son may have been adopted. The couple's much more famous daughter was born around that time as well. Scipio first married off the celebrated Cornelia Metella to Publius Crassus, the son of Marcus Licinius Crassus. After Publius's death at Carrhae, Scipio decided to succeed Caesar as the father-in-law of Pompey, and approached Pompey with an offer to marry him to Cornelia, which Pompey accepted. Pompey was at least thirty years older than Cornelia. This marriage was one of the acts by which Pompey severed his alliance to Caesar and declared himself the champion of the optimates. He and Scipio were consuls together in 52.

Political career
Cicero names "P. Scipio" among the young nobiles on his defence team when Sextus Roscius was prosecuted in 80 BC. He is placed in the company of Marcus Messalla and Metellus Celer, both future consuls.

Metellus Scipio was probably tribune of the plebs in 59 BC, but his patrician status argues against his holding the office. It is possible that Scipio's adoption into a plebeian gens may have qualified him for a tribunate on a technicality. He may have been curule aedile in 57 BC, when he presented funeral games in honour of his adopted father's death, six years earlier.  He was praetor, most likely in 55 BC, during the second consulship of Pompeius and Marcus Crassus.

In 53 BC, Scipio was interrex with Marcus Valerius Messalla. He became consul with Pompeius in 52 BC, the year he arranged the marriage of his newly widowed daughter to him.

Indisputably aristocratic and conservative, Metellus Scipio had been at least a symbolic counterweight to the power of the so-called triumvirate before the death of Crassus in 53 BC. "Opportune deaths," notes Syme, "had enhanced his value, none remaining now of the Metellan consuls."

He is known to have been a member of the College of Pontiffs by 57 BC, and was probably nominated upon the death of his adoptive father in 63, and subsequently elected.

Role in civil war

In January of 49 BC, Scipio persuaded the senate to issue the ultimatum to Caesar that made war inevitable. That same year, Scipio became proconsul of the province of Syria. In Syria and Asia, where he took up winter quarters, he used often oppressive means to gather ships, troops, and money:

Scipio put to death Alexander of Judaea, and was acclaimed Imperator for claimed victories in the Amanus Mountains — as noted disparagingly by Caesar.

In 48 BC, Scipio brought his forces from Asia to Greece, where he manoeuvred against Gnaeus Domitius Calvinus and Lucius Cassius until the arrival of Pompeius. At the Battle of Pharsalus, he commanded the centre. After the optimates' defeat by Caesar, Metellus fled to Africa. With the support of his former rival-in-romance Cato, he wrested the chief command of Pompeius' forces from the loyal Publius Attius Varus, probably in early 47.  In 46, he held command at the Battle of Thapsus, "without skill or success," and was defeated along with Cato. After the defeat, he tried to escape to the Iberian Peninsula to continue the fight, but was cornered by the fleet of Publius Sittius. He committed suicide by stabbing himself, so he would not fall into the hands of his enemies.

Dignity in death
Facing death, Metellus Scipio achieved an uncharacteristic dignity, famously departing from his soldiers with a nonchalant Imperator se bene habet ("Your general's just fine"). These last words elicited strong praise from the Stoic moral philosopher Seneca:

Assessment
Classical scholar John H. Collins summed up the character and reputation of Metellus Scipio:

See also
 Caecilia gens

Selected bibliography
Linderski, Jerzy. "Q. Scipio Imperator." In Imperium sine fine: T. Robert S. Broughton and the Roman Republic. Franz Steiner, 1996, pp. 144–185. Limited preview online.
Syme, Ronald. "The Last Scipiones." In The Augustan Aristocracy. Oxford University Press, 1989, pp. 244–245 online.

References

1st-century BC births
Year of birth uncertain
46 BC deaths
1st-century BC Roman governors of Syria
1st-century BC Roman consuls
Ancient Roman adoptees
Ancient Roman generals
Ancient Roman military personnel who committed suicide
Pius Scipio, Quintus
Cornelii Scipiones
Optimates
Pontifices
Roman Republican praetors